The 1976–77 Elitserien season was the second season of the Elitserien, the top level of ice hockey in Sweden. 10 teams participated in the league, and Brynas IF won the championship.

Standings

Playoffs

Semifinals

Brynäs IF vs MoDo AIK
Brynäs win 2–0 in games.

Färjestads BK vs Leksands IF
Färjestad wins 2–1 in games following neutral site tiebreaker at Gothenburg's Scandinavium.

Third place series
Leksands IF wins 2–0 in games.

Finals
''Brynäs IF wins 2–0 in games and are crowned 1977 Swedish champions in ice hockey (9th title).

External links
 Swedish Hockey League official site
 Elitserien 76–77 on Svenskhockey.com

Swedish Hockey League seasons
1976–77 in Swedish ice hockey
Swedish